FragAttacks, or fragmentation and aggregation attacks, are a group of Wi-Fi vulnerabilities discovered by security research Mathy Vanhoef. Since the vulnerabilities are design flaws in the Wi-Fi standard, any device released after 1997 could be vulnerable. The attack can be executed without special privileges. The attack was detailed on August 5, 2021 at Black Hat Briefings USA and at later at the USENIX 30th Security Symposium, where recordings are shared publicly. The attack does not leave any trace in the network logs.

Patches 
Vanhoef worked with the Wi-Fi Alliance to help vendors issue patches.

Microsoft started issuing patches for Windows 7 through Windows 10 on May 11, 2021.

References

External links 
 Fragment and Forge: Breaking Wi-Fi Through Frame Aggregation and Fragmentation by Mathy Vanhoef

Computer-related introductions in 2021
Computer security exploits
Wi-Fi